Sekolah Menengah Sains Banting (abbreviated BASIS) is a boarding school in Banting, Selangor. It is one of the Sekolah Berasrama Penuh (SBP), or fully residential boarding schools, in Malaysia and is the only one in its district (Kuala Langat).

History
The school was inaugurated on 17 November 2011. It became fully operational on 22 January 2012. Tuan Haji Muhamad Kamaludin bin Taib is the first and current principal of Sekolah Menengah Sains Banting. At that time, the school had only two batches. By 31 January 2012, the school had received approximately 200 new Form 4 (2012) students. The school began its first year with three batches. Under the management of Tuan Haji Muhamad Kamaludin bin Taib, former principal of Sekolah Sultan Alam Shah and Sekolah Menengah Sains Tuanku Munawir, it began to rise in popularity with participation in co-curricular activities and academic achievements in Kuala Langat district level and SBP level. During 2012, the school adopted the motto, "From Zero to Hero". In 2014, the first batch of BASIS had brought the name of the school to the 22nd place out of 68 SBP. In 2015, batch Khattab 1314 had put BASIS at the 13th place of 68 SBPs thus becoming among 20 top schools for SPM 2014 in Malaysia.

Introduction
BASiS has a multi-purpose hall, academic block, residential block (both student and teachers), a mosque, a dining hall and a canteen. The recreation and playground zones contain a football and rugby field, a hockey field, 2 basketball courts (both men and women), 2 tennis courts, 3 badminton courts, 2 sepak takraw courts, 2 volleyball courts, a grandstand and 3 badminton courts inside the hall. The mosque has had several renovations to accommodate greater numbers of students.

Principal
Tuan Haji Kamaludin Taib (2012 – July 2017)

Puan Norsham Binti Nordin (September 2017 – December 2020)

Encik Rijaludin bin Che Mat (January 2021 – present)

Students' Administration Council
Students' Administration Council or Majlis Pimpinan Pelajar (MPP) is a collaboration of 4 councils under the Student's Affair unit (Unit Hal Ehwal Murid).

The councils are: Badan Pengawas (Prefectorial Board), Pengawas Pusat Sumber (Librarian), Badan Dakwah dan Tarbiah (BADAR, Dakwah and Education Council) and Pembimbing Rakan Sebaya (PRS, Peer Preceptors).

The leaders of the MPP are: Badan Pengawas (BP, Prefectorial Board):

Pengawas Pusat Sumber (PPS, Librarian):

Badan Dakwah dan Rohani (BADAR) (Dakwah and Spiritualism Council):

Pembimbing Rakan Sebaya (PRS) (Peer Guidance):

Batch and academic performance
It is a tradition for any SBPs to have numerous batches. In BASiS, the name of every batch has a different meaning. Each of them strives together to achieve their best results in SPM during their senior year to fulfil the ambition expressed in the school motto, "Inspiring Excellence Leading Others".

References

Educational institutions established in 2012
Kuala Langat District
2012 establishments in Malaysia
Co-educational boarding schools
Schools in Selangor